Himmeluret (The Clock of Heaven or The Celestial Clockwork) is a Norwegian silent film from 1925 directed by Amund Rydland and Leif Sinding. Sinding also wrote the screenplay, which is based on Gabriel Scott's comedy Himmeluret (play 1905, novella 1908). David Knudsen, Gunvor Fjørtoft, and Hjalmar Fries appeared in the main roles. Footage described as a "closeup of a naked woman" (naken kvinne forstørret) was cut from the film by censors. The film is now considered lost.

Plot
In Rørland, the ship owner Gutter Fladen is the dominant personality in the town. His daughter Nina has just returned from Paris, and she spends the spring evenings with her childhood love Salve, a skipper on Gutter's boat Haabet.

Cast
 David Knudsen: Gutter Fladen, a ship owner
 Gunvor Fjørtoft: Nina, the ship owner's daughter
 Hjalmar Fries: Salve, a skipper
 Amund Rydland: Brother Daniel
 Katie Rolfsen: Theodine (credited as Käthie Rolfsen)	
 Lars Tvinde: Lars Timiansbakken
 Eugen Skjønberg: Andresen, a general store operator
 Josef Sjøgren: Kristensen, a watchmaker
 Ragnvald Wingar: Rasmussen, a cobbler
 Johanne Voss: Gurine on the stairs, a gossip
 Aagot Nissen: Johanne in the door, a gossip
 Martin Gisti: Ola Ormestøl
 Ingse Gude Caprino: Conchita
 Ruth Brünings-Sandvik: Juanita, a dancer in a restaurant
 Kolbjørn Skjefstad: a bartender

References

External links

Himmeluret at the National Library of Norway

1925 films
Norwegian films based on plays
Films directed by Leif Sinding
Norwegian silent feature films
Norwegian black-and-white films
Norwegian drama films
Lost Norwegian films
1925 lost films
Lost drama films
1925 drama films
Silent drama films